Electronics cartridge may refer to:

 ROM cartridge, a removable enclosure containing read-only memory devices designed to be connected to a computer or games console
 RAM pack, a RAM expansion cartridge
 Data cartridge (tape), magnetic tape in a plastic enclosure
 Tape cartridge, for use in tape drives

See also 
 Cartridge (disambiguation)